Amausi metro station is a metro station on red line of the Lucknow Metro serving the Amausi suburb of Lucknow. It was opened on 8 March 2019.

It is located at the Airport Road in Amausi.

Station layout

Connections

Entry/Exit

See also

References

Lucknow Metro stations